Karel Pechan (born 1901, date of death unknown) was a Czech cyclist. He competed in the team pursuit at the 1924 Summer Olympics.

References

External links
 

1901 births
Year of death missing
Czech male cyclists
Olympic cyclists of Czechoslovakia
Cyclists at the 1924 Summer Olympics
Place of birth missing